Peter Greil is a German materials scientist. He received the Gottfried Wilhelm Leibniz Prize in 2000. He has been a full professor, as well as Chair of the Institute of Glass and Ceramics, at the Friedrich–Alexander University of Erlangen–Nuremberg since 1993.

References

External links
Homepage (old)
Homepage

Gottfried Wilhelm Leibniz Prize winners
Living people
Year of birth missing (living people)
Place of birth missing (living people)